Greycliffe may refer to:

 Greycliffe disaster, a shipping accident in Sydney, Australia
 Greycliffe House is an historic dwelling situated in the Sydney suburb of Vaucluse
 Greycliffe Homestead is a heritage-listed homestead in Biloela, Queensland, Australia 
 Greycliffe, Queensland, a locality in the Shire of Banana, Queensland, Australia